Utterbackia imbecillis, commonly called the paper pondshell, is a species of freshwater mussel, an aquatic bivalve mollusk in the family Unionidae, the river mussels.

Distribution
This species is native to the United States. It is present in the Mississippi interior basin, western and eastern gulf, and the Atlantic Slope drainages. It is a common and widespread species. Thousands of individuals can inhabit a single pond.

It is characterized by its unusually thin shell.

References

Haag, W. R. (2012). North American Freshwater Mussels: Natural History, Ecology, and Conservation. Cambridge University Press. 
Vidrine, M. F. (1993) The historical distributions of fresh-water mussels in Louisiana. Gail O. Vidrine Collectibles. .

Molluscs of the United States
imbecillis
Bivalves described in 1829